Antipathidae is a family of corals in the order Antipatharia, commonly known as black corals. They are generally considered a deep-water taxon; however, some of the most diverse communities are known from tropical shallow waters.

Taxonomy 
This family contains the following genera according to the World Register of Marine Species:
 Allopathes Opresko & Cairns, 1994 -- 3 species
 Antipathes Pallas, 1766 -- 66 species
 Cirrhipathes de Blainville, 1830 -- 16 species
 Hillopathes van Pesch, 1914 -- 1 species
 Pseudocirrhipathes Bo & al., 2009 -- 1 species
 Pteropathes Brook, 1889 -- 1 species
 Stichopathes Brook, 1889 -- 34 species

Bibliography 
 
 TERRANA, LUCAS, et al. “Shallow-Water Black Corals (Cnidaria: Anthozoa: Hexacorallia: Antipatharia) from SW Madagascar.” Zootaxa, vol. 4826, no. 1, 2020, https://doi.org/10.11646/zootaxa.4826.1.1.

References

 
Antipatharia
Cnidarian families